Uche Ogbodo   (born 17 May 1986) is a Nigerian Actress, producer, and red carpet host. She came into the limelight in 2006 with her debut movie Another Bondage and has since then acted in other movies like Four Sisters, Players, Your Holiness, Your Last Action, Honor My Will, The Laptop, and Royal Palace.

Early life
Born in Enugu State to Godwin Ogbodo, and Ada Luisa Ogbodo as the second child in a family of five. Ogbodo spent most of her teenage years in her hometown. She is a graduate of Banking and finance from the University of Nigeria.

Career 
Ogbodo's journey to Nollywood began following the decision of her father to register her with the Actors Guild of Nigeria in Enugu State, and she subsequently acted in other movies such as Be My Val, Family Romance, Festac Town, Forces of Nature, Four Sisters.

In 2011, she was assaulted by Enugu based movie marketers, Amaco Brothers because she supposedly delayed movie production and made them lose money with imminent ban threat and arrest but after investigations by the Actor Guilds of Nigeria, the judgment was placed in her favor.

Personal life
A popular Nigerian article blog "whoiswriter" claims that Uche Ogbodo currently has two kids. She welcomed her first child, Mildred Chinagorom, in 2014 and her second child, Chimsimdiri Lumina Ugwoegbu in June 9, 2021. She married her second daughter's father Bobby Maris traditionally in her hometown in Enugu state on January 5, 2023.

Filmography

References

External links
 

1986 births
Living people
Igbo actresses
21st-century Nigerian actresses
Nigerian film producers
Nigerian film actresses
Actresses from Enugu State